Phouthone Innalay (born 10 October 1993), is a Laotian footballer currently playing as a midfielder.

Career statistics

International

International goals
Scores and results list Laos' goal tally first.

References

1993 births
Living people
Laotian footballers
Laos international footballers
Association football midfielders
Lanexang United F.C. players
Lao Army F.C. players
People from Vientiane